Ceph or CEPH may refer to:

Science and technology
 Ceph (software), a distributed data storage platform
 Cephalopod, any member of the molluscan class Cephalopoda
 Cephalanthera, a genus of orchids

Organizations
 Council on Education for Public Health, a US agency
 Fondation Jean Dausset-CEPH, a genetic research center, formerly the Centre d'Etude du Polymorphisme Humain
 Cephalon (NASDAQ: CEPH), a former American biopharmaceutical company

Other uses
 Ceph, the enemy alien race in the Crysis video games

See also
 Cephalonia, a Greek island